As The Crow Flies is the third album by Cate Brooks, under the pseudonym of The Advisory Circle. It was preceded by the album Other Channels. The album was released on 8 July 2011 on the Ghost Box Music label. The CD sleeve notes and bonus digital booklet contains an introduction by professor Ronald Hutton, as well as a paragraph quoted from his book, The Stations of the Sun.

Track listing

References

External links
 Ghost Box Music page
 Album review - Pitchfork
 BBC Music review

The Advisory Circle albums
Ghost Box Music albums
2011 albums